"La noche es para mí" ("The Night is for Me") is a song by Spanish singer Soraya, which was the  entry in the Eurovision Song Contest 2009, held in Moscow, Russia. It was released on 12 January 2009 in Spain as the second single from Soraya's fourth studio album Sin miedo. The music was composed by Irini Michas, Dimitri Stassos and Jason Gill, and the lyrics were written by Felipe Pedroso.

Background
The song, composed in 2007 as "Afta pou ksereis" and written in Greek, was first offered to Helena Paparizou for her fourth album, but she turned it down as she wanted pop rock themes. None of these three artists recorded or released the song, so it was therefore eligible to participate in the Eurovision Song Contest 2009 according to EBU rules.

Soraya and her producers agreed to include the song in her album Sin miedo, released on October 13, 2008. The song was altered and Spanish lyrics were written by Felipe Pedroso. On 20 December 2008, after many fans requested it, Soraya announced she would submit the song to Eurovisión 2009: El retorno (the contest organised by TVE to choose the Spanish Eurovision entrant), 2 hours before the deadline. She eventually won the final of that contest on February 28, 2009, gaining the "passport" to Moscow.

Eurovision 2009
The song competed automatically in the final of the contest on May 16, 2009. A new Eurovision version of the song was revealed live at the contest itself, a version not intended to be released commercially. The new version started more slowly with a violin solo and reached higher notes by the end. The song was well considered in the previous polls, but it finished 24th with 23 points in the 50/50-result. If only jury votes had been given, Soraya would have finished last, while in only televoting votes she finished on the joint 20th position.

Charts

References

2009 songs
2009 singles
Eurovision songs of 2009
Eurovision songs of Spain
Songs written by Dimitri Stassos
Songs written by Jason Gill (musician)
Universal Music Group singles